The Aboriginal Shire of Hope Vale is a local government area in Far North Queensland, Queensland, Australia, north of the town of Cooktown. The majority of the Shire consists of Deed of Grant land that is held for the benefit of Aboriginal people particularly concerned with the land and their ancestors and descendants.

History

Guugu Yimithirr (also known as Koko Yindjir, Gugu Yimidhirr, Guguyimidjir) is an Australian Aboriginal language of Hope Vale and the Cooktown area. The language region includes the local government area of the Aboriginal Shire of Hope Vale and the Shire of Cook, particularly the localities of Cape Bedford, Battle Camp and sections of the Normanby River and Annan River.

The area originally was set up as a German Lutheran mission in 1885 by missionaries, at what came to be known as the Cape Bedford Mission,  from what is now Hope Vale. The residents were evacuated to Woorabinda during World War II in 1942, and the land was used by the army. Many of the people died, and the survivors were not allowed to return until 1949. In September 1952, the land was formally gazetted as an Aboriginal reserve.

In 1986, under the Community Services (Aborigines) Act 1984, a Deed of Grant in Trust was given to the Hope Vale community. Like other DOGIT communities of the time, Hope Vale had a Community Council elected by Aboriginal people living in the community.

Responsibilities
The Hope Vale Aboriginal Shire Council operates under the requirements set out in the Queensland Local Government Act. However, in the township of Hope Vale the council is also the Trustee of the land and as such has added responsibilities that are quite different from a typical local government body. This includes responsibility for fisheries, alcohol management and employment initiatives.

The Hope Vale Aboriginal Shire Council operates an Indigenous Knowledge Centre (Nganthaanun-Milbi\Guugu Magubadaaygu), at the Jack Bambie Memorial Centre, in Hope Vale.

Mayors 

 2008-2020 : Gregory Raymond McLean
2020–present: Jason Grant Woibo

See also
 Hope Vale, Queensland

References

External links
 University of Queensland: Queensland Places: Hope Vale Aboriginal Shire Council

 
Local government areas of Queensland
Aboriginal communities in Queensland
Far North Queensland
1986 establishments in Australia